The following is a list of films produced in the Tamil film industry in India in 1952, in alphabetical order.

1952

References

Tamil films
Lists of 1952 films by country or language
1952
1950s Tamil-language films